Karim Janat (born 11 August 1998) is an Afghan cricketer. He made his first-class debut against the England Lions on 7 December 2016. Prior to his first-class debut, he was part of Afghanistan's squad for the 2016 Under-19 Cricket World Cup.

Domestic and T20 franchise career
Along with Zahir Khan, he was the joint-leading wicket-taker in the 2017 Ghazi Amanullah Khan Regional One Day Tournament, with twelve dismissals. He was also the leading wicket-taker for Kabul Region in the 2018 Ahmad Shah Abdali 4-day Tournament, with 30 dismissals in ten matches.

In September 2018, he was named in Kandahar's squad in the first edition of the Afghanistan Premier League tournament. In September 2020, he was the joint winner of the player of the tournament award in the 2020 Shpageeza Cricket League. In 2021, he received his first selections in overseas franchise tournaments, being selected by the Colombo Stars for the 2021 Lanka Premier League, and the Sylhet Sunrisers in the 2022 Bangladesh Premier League. In July 2022, he was signed by the Colombo Stars for the third edition of the Lanka Premier League.

International career
He made his Twenty20 International (T20I) debut for Afghanistan against the United Arab Emirates on 14 December 2016. He scored 25 runs in the match and took 3 wickets. This all-round performance gave him his first man of the match award. He made his One Day International (ODI) debut for Afghanistan against Zimbabwe at the Harare Sports Club on 24 February 2017.

In December 2018, he was named in Afghanistan's under-23 team for the 2018 ACC Emerging Teams Asia Cup. On 16 November 2019, in the second match against the West Indies, he took his first five-wicket haul in T20I cricket. He took five wickets for eleven runs from his four overs, and was named the player of the match. In November 2019, he was named in Afghanistan's Test squad for the one-off match against the West Indies.

In September 2021, he was named in Afghanistan's squad for the 2021 ICC Men's T20 World Cup.

References

External links
 

1998 births
Living people
Afghan cricketers
Afghanistan One Day International cricketers
Afghanistan Twenty20 International cricketers
Cricketers from Kabul
Spin Ghar Tigers cricketers
Kabul Eagles cricketers
Kandahar Knights cricketers